Balizhuang Subdistrict is a subdistrict of Chaoyang District, Beijing, deriving its name from its location 8 Chinese li from Chaoyangmen and located within the 4th Ring Road. It borders Liulitun Subdistrict to the north, Pingfang Township to the east, Gaobeidian Township to the south, Hujialou and Jianwai Subdistricts to the west. As of 2020, it has a total population of 98,084.

History

Administrative Divisions 
At the end of 2021, there are 16 communities within the subdistrict:

See also
List of township-level divisions of Beijing

References

Chaoyang District, Beijing
Subdistricts of Beijing